The UAE Vice Presidents Cup was played between 2009 and 2012. There have been a total of 3 editions.

Winners 
 2009/10 : Dubai 2–2 Al Shaab (aet, 5-3 pens)
 2010/11 : Ajman 2–1 Dibba Al Fujairah
 2011/12 : Al Dhafra 2–0 Kalba

See also
 UAE League
 UAE Super Cup
 UAE President Cup
 Etisalat Emirates Cup
 UAE Federation Cup

External links
 Details at goalzz.com

References

Vice
National association football cups
Recurring sporting events established in 2004
2004 establishments in the United Arab Emirates